Edward Sebastian Grigg, 4th Baron Altrincham (born 18 December 1965) is a British hereditary peer and Conservative member of the House of Lords. He was educated at Oriel College, Oxford and was a member of the Bullingdon Club along with David Cameron and Boris Johnson, appearing in a well-known 1987 photograph of the club's members. He worked for Goldman Sachs.

He is married to Rachel Kelly whose memoir Black Rainbow was published in 2014. He wrote about his family's experience with depression in the Evening Standard.

He unsuccessfully stood for the House of Commons for Heywood and Middleton constituency in 1997. He became head of investment banking at Credit Suisse UK in 2007. He advised HM Treasury on the recapitalisations of the Royal Bank of Scotland, HBOS and Lloyds in October 2008 as part of a Credit Suisse team working from a makeshift office in one of the Treasury's corridors. He is a non-executive director of The Co-operative Bank.

Lord Altrincham was elected as a member of the House of Lords in June 2021 in a Conservative hereditary peers' by-election. He took the oath on 1 July 2021. He made his maiden speech on 13 October 2021, talking about his wife's depression, working as a banker, standing for Parliament in 1997 and his family's history. His elder son Edward is heir to the Baroncy.

References

1965 births
Living people
4
Conservative Party (UK) hereditary peers
Hereditary peers elected under the House of Lords Act 1999